The Siku Quanshu Zongmu Tiyao ("Annotated Catalog of the Complete Imperial Library") is an annotated catalog of the thousands of works that were considered for inclusion in the Siku Quanshu. Work for the 200-chapter catalog began in 1773 and was completed in 1798. The Siku Zongmu, as it is also known, is the largest pre-modern Chinese book catalog. It contains bibliographic notices on all 3,461 works that were included in the Siku Quanshu, as well as shorter notes on 6,793 works that were not included in the imperial library but listed only by title (cunmu 存目). Thousands of books are omitted from the catalog, including the almost 3,000 works that were destroyed by the Qing because they were considered to be anti-Manchu. The notices themselves were written by many hands, but the final drafts were edited by chief editor Ji Yun. The content of the Annotated Catalog reflects the strength of Han learning in Qing scholarly circles.

Notes and references

1798 non-fiction books
Bibliography
Chinese encyclopedias
Qing dynasty literature